Nathalie Colin (born 17 April, 1966) is a French jewellery designer and the director of Swarovski.

Biography 
Colin was born on 17 April 1966, in France in the town of Cornimont (Vosges, 88).

She graduated from Institute de Commerce de Nancy, later she worked for Perry Ellis in the merchandising department, with Marc Jacobs as the current director.

In 1990 in Paris, she started to work as a marketing director for Promotion, a trend-forecasting agency. In 1998, Colin founded her own company, Cultural Sushi, a design agency. In 1999/2000, she relocated to Beijing, China to start an apparel brand with Olivier Lapidus for a Chinese company (Yimian Group).

Career 

In 2006, she joined Swarovski under the title of Director of Swarovski.

From 2014 to June 2016, her director role extended to Executive Vice President Communication.

Since 2006, she has been a member of the Management Board for the Consumer Goods Business (CGB) division.

Publications 
Nathalie released a book titled, Multifaced(t)s, style yourself with jewelry, in 2012.

References

1966 births
French jewellery designers
Living people